"Running on Air" is a song written and performed by Austrian singer Nathan Trent. The song was intended to be released on 28 February 2017, but leaked online through Spotify and YouTube on 26 February. It represented Austria in the Eurovision Song Contest 2017.

Trent recorded an Italian version of the song titled "Fino A Che Volerò" and a remixed Spanish version titled "Aire", which was produced by Vincent Bueno.

Eurovision Song Contest

On 19 December 2016, Trent was announced as the Austrian representative to the Eurovision Song Contest 2017. As he was previously announced as a shortlisted contestant in the German national final, Unser Song 2017, he was forced to withdraw in order to accept the offer to be the Austrian representative. On 26 February 2017, it was confirmed that he'd be singing "Running on Air" at the Eurovision Song Contest. While its release date was given as 28 February, the song leaked online through Spotify and YouTube the same day as its announcement. Austria competed in the first half of the second semi-final at the Eurovision Song Contest.

Despite taking 93 points from the juries, it received none from the public televote, reaching 16th place overall.

Track listing

Charts

Release history

References

Eurovision songs of Austria
Eurovision songs of 2017
2017 songs
2017 singles